Cormac Cruinn Ó Máille (died 1384) was an Irish noble.

Ó Máille was a grandson of Eoghan mac Diarmait Ó Máille, a brother of Domnall Ruadh O Maille (died 1337). Cormac was a son of Domnall mac Eoghan, and had brothers Eoghan, Brian, Cormac Buadhach, Ruaibh.  Though not a chief himself, Cormac was of the line that provided all subsequent Ó Máille Chiefs of the Name.

The Annals of the Four Masters record that "A meeting took place between O'Flaherty and O'Malley, but a quarrel arose between them, in which Owen O'Malley, Cormac O'Malley (i.e., Cormac Cruinn) and many others besides these, were slain by the people of O'Flaherty."

See also

 Maille mac Conall
 Domnall Ruadh O Maille
 Grace O'Malley
 Martin O'Malley

References

 The History of Mayo, Hubert T. Knox, 1908, p. 389.

Medieval Gaels from Ireland
People from County Mayo
14th-century Irish people
Irish lords
1384 deaths
Year of birth unknown